MasterChef is a competitive cooking reality show produced by Endemol Shine UK and Banijay and broadcast in 60 countries around the world. In the UK, it is produced by the BBC. The show initially ran from 1990 to 2001 and was revived in 2005 as MasterChef Goes Large.  The revival featured a new format devised by Franc Roddam and John Silver, with Karen Ross producing. In 2008, the name was changed back to MasterChef but the format remained unchanged.

The series currently appears in four versions: the main MasterChef series; Celebrity MasterChef; MasterChef: The Professionals, with working chefs; and Junior MasterChef, with children between the ages of nine and twelve. The format and style of the show have been reproduced around the world in various international versions.

Original series
In the original series, amateur cooks competed for the title of Master Chef. The show featured nine rounds leading up to three semifinals and a final.  In each round, three contestants were tasked with preparing a gourmet three-course meal in under two hours. The contestants could choose the meal, although there was a price limit on ingredients. "Everyday" ingredients and equipment were provided, and contestants could also bring up to five "speciality" ingredients or utensils.

The first incarnation of the series was presented by Loyd Grossman, who was joined each week by a professional chef and a celebrity to act as judges. In each episode, Grossman and the guest judges discussed the menus, talked to the contestants, and finally ate and judged the food. The judges' "cogitations" originally took place off-camera, but later episodes included edited highlights of the discussions after the food had been tasted and before the winner was announced.

In 1998, Grossman decided to take a sabbatical and the series was not made in his absence. He returned to present the 1999 series but left the show in 2000.

Grossman's departure and 2001 revamp
In 2001, the show underwent a makeover in response to declining ratings. It was moved from its traditional Sunday afternoon slot on BBC One to a Tuesday night slot on BBC Two and the format of the show was modified. The celebrity judge was no longer included and the contestants had to cook two courses in 90 minutes, which was extended to two-and-a-half hours for three courses in the final episode. As an additional requirement, each contestant had to use the same key ingredient in each course.

In October 2000, Grossman left in anger over the proposed changes and was replaced by chef Gary Rhodes, who had previously presented MasterChef USA. Rhodes' advice to contestants was more critical than Grossman's and the show was acclaimed for its more serious tone, which later inspired the MasterChef Goes Large format and other cooking competitions like Hell's Kitchen. However, the new version of the show did not revive ratings as hoped and was cancelled by the BBC after the first series.

Revived series

In 2005, the executive producers Franc Roddam and John Silver, with the series producer Karen Ross, radically overhauled the show's format and introduced a new series. It was initially titled MasterChef Goes Large, but the name reverted to MasterChef in 2008. The new series is judged by John Torode and Gregg Wallace, with voice-over narration provided by India Fisher.

The show proved very popular and became one of BBC Two's more successful early evening programmes, leading to an announcement by the BBC in 2009 that it would be promoted to BBC One.

In February 2022, the BBC and Shine TV announced that they have agreed a multi-series six-year deal for the programme, and from 2024 the production base would move from London to Birmingham. In January 2023, it was reported that Birmingham City Council has approved BBC plans to use the old Banana Warehouse in Digbeth as the new MasterChef studios.

Format

Each series is broadcast on five nights a week for eight weeks. During the first six weeks, the first four episodes of each week are heats and the fifth episode is a quarter-final. Six contestants enter each heat and the winner becomes a quarter-finalist. At the end of each week, the four quarter-finalists compete and a semi-finalist is chosen. After six weeks, the six semi-finalists compete in the final two weeks.

In 2010, the judges were given more flexibility, allowing them to advance more than one contestant to the quarter-finals or, in one instance, none at all. Series 7 of Master Chef had auditions with a format similar to The X Factor, in which hopeful chefs cooked in front of the judges to secure a spot in the competition. More than 20,000 people applied to audition for the series.

Heats
The heats follow a three-round format:
 The Market Test: the contestants must invent a dish using ingredients from the show's market. They have 15 minutes to select ingredients and 1 hour and 10 minutes to cook the meal. Three contestants are eliminated from the competition and those remaining advance to the Impression Test.
 The Calling Card: the contestants must invent a dish from scratch in 75 minutes (originally 40 minutes until 2009). The contestants can choose any ingredients they like. 
 The Invention Test: the contestants are given two boxes: one with sweet items and the other with savoury items. They must pick a box and make a dish using its ingredients within 75 minutes.
 The Impression Test: the contestants must cook a two-course meal in 75 minutes for past winners and finalists of MasterChef. They are given one hour to serve the main course and 15 minutes afterwards to serve dessert. This segment was first featured in 2017.

Quarter-finals
The format of the quarter-finals has changed over the years. Before 2010, the format featured three rounds:
 The Ingredients Test: the contestants were asked to identify a selection of ingredients or produce.
 The Passion Test: the contestants each had one minute to convince the judges of their overwhelming passion for food.
 After eliminating one contestant, the remaining three quarter-finalists each produced a three-course meal in 1 hour and 20 minutes.

In 2010, the quarter-final format was cut to two rounds:
 The Choice Test: the contestants were given 15 minutes to cook their choice of either a pre-selected fish recipe or meat recipe with the judges supervising. At least one contestant was eliminated after this round.
 The remaining quarter-finalists each produced a two-course meal in one hour.

The current quarter-final format consists of two rounds: 
 The Palate Test: Judge John Torode cooks a dish for the contestants, and they must identify the ingredients and try to recreate the dish using the ingredients available to them. 
 The Choice Test: the contestants have 80 minutes to create a showstopping dish for the judges and a special celebrity food critic.

Comeback Week
The sixth week is called "Comeback Week" and features contestants from previous series of MasterChef who did not advance past the heats or quarter-finals. The format changes for this special week. It includes:
 The Skill Test: the contestants have 25 minutes to cook one of two pre-selected recipes. Some contestants may be eliminated after this round.
 The Palate Test: Torode cooks a complex dish and asks the contestants one by one to taste the dish and identify its ingredients. Some contestants may be eliminated after this round.
 The Pressure Test: the contestants work a lunchtime shift at a busy restaurant under the supervision of a professional chef who comments on their performance.
 The remaining contestants have one hour to cook a two-course meal. One contestant is selected to advance to the quarter-final.
 The comeback quarter-finalists then cook head-to-head in a larger version of the Invention Test, cooking one dish in an hour. One contestant is selected to advance to the semi-finals.

MasterChef Live
MasterChef Live is an extension of the television programme. It has been held each November since 2009 and the event lasts three days. It is hosted at London Olympia and is co-located with the annual Wine Show.  Highlights of the event include live cooking demonstrations in the Chefs' Theater, celebrity chefs, former contestants, critics and MasterChef-style cook-offs.

Celebrity MasterChef
Celebrity MasterChef was devised as a celebrity version of MasterChef Goes Large. The show was screened on BBC One from 2006 to 2011. Originally, 24 celebrities participated in each series with three contestants per episode following the full MasterChef Goes Large test.

In 2011, the programme was moved to a daily daytime slot with 30 episodes screened over six weeks and with only 16 celebrities. Catch-up shows were broadcast on Fridays at 20:30 (30 minutes) and on Saturdays at various times (60 minutes). In 2012, the show moved to BBC Two due to low ratings and returned to an evening 18:30 slot. In 2013, it moved back to BBC One prime time, shown at 20:00. Since 2014, the show has had 20 celebrities competing for the title.

Contestants

The winner from each year is in bold text.

Series 1 (2006)
Matt Dawson, Arabella Weir, Charlie Dimmock, David Grant, Fred MacAulay, Graeme Le Saux, Hardeep Singh Kohli, Helen Lederer, Ian McCaskill, Jilly Goolden, Kristian Digby, Lady Isabella Hervey, Linda Barker, Marie Helvin, Paul Young, Richard Arnold, Roger Black, Rowland Rivron, Sarah Cawood, Sheila Ferguson, Simon Grant, Sue Perkins, Tony Hadley and Toyah Willcox.

Series 2 (2007)
Nadia Sawalha, Midge Ure, Craig Revel Horwood, Jeremy Edwards, Chris Bisson, Martin Hancock, Sunetra Sarker, Gemma Atkinson, Sherrie Hewson, Pauline Quirke, Rani Price, Chris Hollins, Matthew Wright, Angela Rippon, Sue Cook, Lorne Spicer, Emma Forbes, Jeff Green, Darren Bennett, Sally Gunnell, Mark Foster, Matt James, Robbie Earle and Phil Tufnell.

Series 3 (2008)
Liz McClarnon, Linda Robson, Louis Emerick, Debra Stephenson, Christopher Parker, Joe McGann, Steven Pinder, Mark Moraghan, Vicki Michelle, Sean Wilson, Clare Grogan, Hywel Simons, DJ Spoony, Claire Richards, Denise Lewis, Noel Whelan, Andi Peters, Andrew Castle, Michael Buerk, Kaye Adams, Julia Bradbury, Josie D'Arby and Ninia Benjamin.

Series 4 (2009)
Jayne Middlemiss, Colin Murray, Wendi Peters, Simon Shepherd, Janet Ellis, Deena Payne, Iwan Thomas, Rav Wilding, Pete Waterman, Stephen K. Amos, Gemma Bissix, Shirley Robertson, Ian Bleasdale, Paul Martin, Tracy-Ann Oberman, Brian Moore, Saira Khan, Rosie Boycott, Michael Obiora, Joel Ross, Shobna Gulati, Dennis Taylor, Siân Lloyd, Jan Leeming and Joe Swift.

There was also a week of Comeback contestants featuring Joe McGann, Marie Helvin, Linda Barker, Claire Richards, Rowland Rivron, Ninia Benjamin, Steven Pinder, Wendi Peters, Helen Lederer, Tony Hadley, Martin Hancock and Jeff Green.

Series 5 (2010)
Lisa Faulkner, Neil Stuke, Richard Farleigh, Nihal Arthanayake, Alex Fletcher, Tessa Sanderson, Jenny Powell, Colin Jackson, Tricia Penrose, Martin Roberts, Christine Hamilton, Chris Walker, Dick Strawbridge, Danielle Lloyd, Marcus Patric, Dean Macey, Mark Chapman, Jennie Bond, Mark Little and Kym Mazelle.

Series 6 (2011)
Phil Vickery, Kirsty Wark, Nick Pickard, Darren Campbell, Linda Lusardi, Michelle Mone, Ruth Goodman, Aggie MacKenzie, Ricky Groves, Margi Clarke, Colin McAllister, Justin Ryan, Shobu Kapoor, Sharon Maughan, Tim Lovejoy and Danny Goffey.

Series 7 (2012)
Emma Kennedy, Danny Mills, Michael Underwood, Zöe Salmon, Gareth Gates, Cheryl Baker, Laila Rouass, George Layton, Diarmuid Gavin, Richard McCourt, Rebecca Romero, Jamie Theakston, Jenny Eclair, Javine Hylton, Steve Parry and Anne Charleston.

Series 8 (2013)
Ade Edmondson, John Thomson, Heidi Range, Shane Lynch, Miranda Krestovnikoff, Denise Black, Phillips Idowu, Speech Debelle, Brian Capron, Les Dennis, Matthew Hoggard, Katy Brand, Shappi Khorsandi, Joe Calzaghe, Jo Wood and Janet Street-Porter.

Series 9 (2014)
Sophie Thompson, Christopher Biggins, Todd Carty, Tina Hobley, Kiki Dee, JB Gill, Wayne Sleep, Alison Hammond, Tania Bryer, Amanda Burton, Jason Connery, Ken Morley, Millie Mackintosh, Emma Barton, Russell Grant, Alex Ferns, Leslie Ash, Jodie Kidd, Charley Boorman and Susannah Constantine.

Series 10 (2015)
Kimberly Wyatt, Keith Chegwin, Sarah Harding, Yvette Fielding, Arlene Phillips, Samira Ahmed, Andy Akinwolere, Syd Little, Amanda Donohoe, Craig Gazey, Tom Parker, Patricia Potter, Chesney Hawkes, Danny Crates, Mica Paris, Sheree Murphy, Natalie Lowe, Scott Maslen, Rylan Clark and Sam Nixon.

Series 11 (2016)
Alexis Conran, Donna Air, Neil Back, Amelle Berrabah, Marcus Butler, Tommy Cannon, Amy Childs, Richard Coles, David Harper, Audley Harrison, Cherry Healey, Liz Johnson, Tina Malone, Louise Minchin, Laila Morse, Jimmy Osmond, Sid Owen, Gleb Savchenko, Sinitta and Simon Webbe.

Series 12 (2017)
Angellica Bell, Rebecca Adlington, Abdullah Afzal, Kate Bottley, Patti Boulaye, Brian Bovell, Tyger Drew-Honey, Lesley Garrett, Dev Griffin, Barney Harwood, Stephen Hendry, Jaymi Hensley, Ulrika Jonsson, Henri Leconte, Debbie McGee, Aasmah Mir, Jim Moir, Nick Moran, Julia Somerville and Rachel Stevens.

Series 13 (2018)
John Partridge, Michelle Ackerley, Chizzy Akudolu, Keith Allen, Clara Amfo, Martin Bayfield, Jay Blades, Frankie Bridge, Gemma Collins, Josh Cuthbert, Carol Decker, Anita Harris, Jean Johansson, Zoe Lyons, Spencer Matthews, Lisa Maxwell, Monty Panesar, Stella Parton, AJ Pritchard and Stef Reid.

Series 14 (2019)
Greg Rutherford, Élizabeth Bourgine, Joey Essex, Alex George, Andy Grant, Rickie Haywood-Williams, Judge Jules, Josie Long, Oti Mabuse, Kellie Maloney, Dominic Parker, Vicky Pattison, Martha Reeves, Zandra Rhodes, Neil Ruddock, Jenny Ryan, Tomasz Schafernaker, Mim Shaikh, Dillian Whyte and Adam Woodyatt.

Series 15 (2020)
Riyadh Khalaf, Shyko Amos, John Barnes, Jeff Brazier, Baga Chipz, Phil Daniels, Karen Gibson, Gethin Jones (withdrew due to illness), Amar Latif, Lady Leshurr, Dominic Littlewood, Judi Love, Felicity Montagu, Judy Murray, Matthew Pinsent, Sam Quek, Crissy Rock, Thomas Skinner, Myles Stephenson and Pete Wicks.

Series 16 (2021)
Kadeena Cox, Nabil Abdulrashid, Bez, Kem Cetinay, Munya Chawawa, Michelle Collins, Dion Dublin, Gavin Esler, Patrick Grant, Duncan James, Melissa Johns, Will Kirk, Penny Lancaster, Megan McKenna, Su Pollard, Katie Price, Johannes Radebe, Rita Simons, Joe Swash and Melanie Sykes.

Series 17 (2022)
Lisa Snowdon, Richard Blackwood, Melanie Blatt, Jimmy Bullard, Paul Chuckle, Nancy Dell'Olio, Chris Eubank, Kirsty Gallacher, Danny Jones, Katya Jones, Lesley Joseph, Kae Kurd, Gareth Malone, Queen MoJo, Cliff Parisi, Adam Pearson, Clarke Peters, Kitty Scott-Claus, Ryan Thomas and Faye Winter.

Other versions and spin-offs

MasterChef: The Professionals

MasterChef: The Professionals, a version for professional chefs, was introduced in 2008.

Junior MasterChef

Junior MasterChef originally ran from 1994 to 1999 for contestants under 16 years old. It was revived in 2010 with contestants between nine and twelve years old. A second series of the revived format ran in 2012 and a third series followed in 2014.

Young MasterChef
In February 2022, BBC Three has commissioned Young MasterChef. The series will air in 2023.

Controversy 
MasterChef was involved in a controversy during the 13th episode of its 14th series when Wallace and Torode criticised a rendang dish made by the Malaysian-born contestant Zaleha Kadir Olpin for its poor quality. Zaleha had been given a task to make a chicken dish in thirty minutes and chose to attempt rendang, which normally takes several hours to prepare. The judges deemed the dish inedible because the chicken skin was rubbery and undercooked and advised her that with a thirty-minute task she should have made a crispy fried chicken with a sauce. Many commentators, particularly from Malaysia and Indonesia, pointed out that rendang is usually cooked as a stew and is not intended to be crispy, and that both judges had failed to differentiate between "crispy" and "under-cooked".

Najib Razak, the Malaysian Prime Minister at the time, joined the conversation with a subtle tweet denouncing the judges' opinion. The former Malaysian prime minister Mahathir Mohamed also joined in, suggesting that the judges were confusing rendang with KFC.

Winners

MasterChef (original series)

Note: The original MasterChef series did not appear in 1998.

MasterChef Goes Large and MasterChef (revived series)

MasterChef Goes Large

MasterChef
The show's original name returned in series 4 in 2008.

Celebrity MasterChef

Young MasterChef

Charity specials

Other notable contestants

Transmission guide

Original series

Specials
 Happy 10th Birthday MasterChef: TX 18 June 2000
 Tales from the MasterChef Kitchen: Series 1, 10 editions from 2 July 2000 – 3 September 2000
 Celebrity Special: TX 27 August 2000

Revived series

MasterChef Goes Large

MasterChef
The show's original name returned in series 4 in 2008.

Specials
 What The Winners Did Next – featured winners from series 1 and 2 of MasterChef Goes Large, broadcast on 22 January 2007

Notes
1. The final was postponed from its 9 April 2021 air date due to the death of Prince Philip, Duke of Edinburgh.

Celebrity MasterChef

Specials

A Recipe for Success
A six-part series looking back over 15 years of Celebrity MasterChef, first episode broadcast on 6 August 2020.

Christmas Cook-Off
Christmas special episodes, where past contestants competed to hold the title of Christmas champion; first episode broadcast on 21 December 2020, second episode broadcast on 23 December 2020.

The winner from each episode is in bold text.

21 December 2020: Janet Street-Porter, Christopher Biggins, Dev Griffin and Vicky Pattison
23 December 2020: Craig Revel Horwood, Amar Latif, Crissy Rock and Spencer Matthews
21 December 2021: Joey Essex, Judi Love, Neil Ruddock, Oti Mabuse and Su Pollard
23 December 2021: Gemma Collins, Joe Swash, Les Dennis, Mica Paris and Rev. Richard Coles
23 December 2022: Bez, Josh Cuthbert, Lesley Garrett and Iwan Thomas
30 December 2022: AJ Pritchard, Chizzy Akudolu, Kitty Scott-Claus and Megan McKenna

Books

See also
 MasterChef: The Professionals
 Junior MasterChef

References

External links
 
 
 Celebrity MasterChef
 
 
 

UK
1990 British television series debuts
BBC television game shows
British cooking television shows
1990s British game shows
2000s British game shows
2010s British game shows
2020s British game shows
English-language television shows
British television series revived after cancellation
Television series by Banijay
1990s British cooking television series
2000s British cooking television series
2010s British cooking television series
2020s British cooking television series